Vito Noto is a born Italian, naturalized Swiss industrial designer.

Early life 

Vito Noto was born in Ragusa, Italy, in 1955. His family moved to the Swiss Canton of Lucerne in 1958, then in 1969 to Canton Ticino.

He studied  at the Scuola Politecnica di Design in Milan. After his studies he worked at various design studios in Zurich, Hamburg and Paris.

Career 

In 1982 he set up his own industrial design studio based in Cadro. With his team he has  designed products for industries, furniture, graphic elements, website and machinery.  
He has received awards including: the Design Preis Schweiz, the Price Compasso d’Oro, and the IF Die gute Industrieform, ADI Design Index.

He teaches in technical institutes and universities. From 2005 to 2015 he held the position of President of the Photo Club of Lugano.

Awards
IF Die gute Industrieform 1985, rotary transfer machine: “RM 16”
Compasso d’Oro 1991, electronic franking machine: “GAMMA 25 Elettronica” 
IF Die gute Industrieform 1990, Vertical storage system: “LISTA AG”
Compasso d’Oro 1994, operative vehicles from the storage room to the work places: “Clip Case/Clip Case Rack” 
Design Preis Schweiz 1995, operative vehicles from the storage room to the work places: “Clip Case/Clip Case Rack”
Design Preis Schweiz 1995, electromedical laboratory for automatic analysis and preparation ofmicroplate samples: “Microlab F.A.M.E.”
Compasso d’Oro 1994, System for citofluorometrics analysis: ”LYSET” 
ADI Design Index 2000, 24 hours clock: “Giorno/Notte”
A DI Design Index 2002, Laboratory pipetting device: “PIPETBOY”
StampNews.com: Top 10 most important postage stamps 2011, Fürstentum Liechtenstein: “Renewable energy”
A DI Design Index 2016, equipment for the textile/weaving industry: "ECOSMART"

Publications
DESIGNsuisse
SWISS DESIGN
Ticino Business
PlastDesign
Giornale del Popolo 
Cooperazione

References

1955 births
Living people
People from Ragusa, Sicily
Italian designers
Businesspeople from Sicily